Baranomyinae is an extinct subfamily of rodent from the Cricetidae, that inhabited Asia, Europe, North America in Pliocene epoch. It was first described by Miklós Kretzoi in 1955.

Genera 
 Anatolomys Schaub, 1934
 Baranomys Kormos, 1933
 Microtodon Miller, 1928

References 

Fossil taxa described in 1955
Cricetidae
Pliocene mammals of Europe
Pliocene mammals of North America
Pliocene mammals of Asia
Prehistoric rodents